WWVH is the callsign of the U.S. National Institute of Standards and Technology's shortwave radio time signal station located at the Barking Sands Missile Range, in Kekaha, on the island of Kauai in the state of Hawaii.  

WWVH is the Pacific sister station to WWV, and has a similar broadcast format.  Like WWV, WWVH's main function is the dissemination of official U.S. Government time, through exactly the same methods as found on WWV's signal.

To minimize interference with the WWV broadcasts on the same frequencies, WWVH's broadcasts on 5, 10 and 15 MHz are directional, pointed primarily west.  Despite this strategy, in certain places, particularly on the west coast of North America; and at certain times, due to ionospheric conditions, the listener can actually hear both WWV and WWVH on the same frequency at the same time.  The information modulated on the carrier is modified to reduce confusion if both are received simultaneously.  In particular, voice announcements on one correspond to silent periods on the other. WWVH uses a female voice (Jane Barbe) to distinguish itself from WWV, which uses a male voice. WWVH time signals can also be accessed by telephone.

Transmission system 

WWVH broadcasts its signal on four transmitters, one for each frequency.  The 2.5 MHz transmitter puts out an ERP of 5 kW, while the other transmitters use 10 kW of ERP.  The 2.5 MHz antenna is one half-wavelength tall, and radiates in an omnidirectional pattern.  The remaining antennas each consist of two elements one half-wavelength tall and horizontally separated by one quarter-wavelength.  The signal radiating from one element is in quadrature phase with respect to the signal from the other.  This results in a cardioid radiation pattern with a maximum gain directed west.

Broadcast format 

The WWVH signal is extremely similar to the WWV signal, but some changes have been made to reduce confusion if both are heard at once:
 The 5 ms second ticks are 6 cycles of 1,200 Hz rather than 5 cycles of 1,000 Hz.  The 800 ms minute beep is also 1,200 Hz.  (Like WWV, this is omitted during minutes 29 and 59, and changed to 1,500 Hz at the top of each hour.)
 The voice announcements use a female voice (that of Jane Barbe) and last 7.5 seconds starting 15 seconds before the minute.  (WWV broadcasts in a male voice during the last 7.5 seconds of each minute.)
 The audio tones sent during the first 45 seconds of most minutes are swapped: 600 Hz is played during even minutes, and 500 Hz is played during odd minutes.  (Receiving both simultaneously gives the listener a sound similar to a continuously-ringing chime.)
 The A440 tone marking the hour is sent during minute 1 (as opposed to minute 2 for WWV).  Like WWV, it is omitted during the first hour of each UTC day.
 The audio tones are suppressed while WWV is transmitting voice announcements: minutes 00, 08–10, 14–19, and 30.
 The voice announcements are rescheduled relative to WWV:
 Station identification is made during minutes 29 and 59 (vs. 00 and 30)
 GPS satellite health reports are transmitted during minutes 43 and 44 (vs. 14 and 15)
 NOAA space weather geoalerts are transmitted during minute 45 (vs. 18)
 National Weather Service storm warnings for all sections of the Pacific Ocean are broadcast during minutes 48–51, overflowing to minute 52 when necessary (vs. Atlantic and northeast Pacific information during 08–10 and 11).
 Minutes 03 and 47 are used for NIST special announcements when necessary (vs. 04 and 16). Like WWV, prior to the OMEGA Navigation System shutdown in 1997, the OMEGA status report was broadcast at :47 past the hour.

Half-hourly station identification announcement 
WWVH identifies itself twice each hour, at 29 and 59 minutes past the hour.  The text of the identification is as follows:

Reception reports sent to that address will on request be answered with a QSL card.

Telephone service 
WWVH's time signal can also be accessed by calling +1 (808) 335-4363.

See also 
 Radio clock – time-signal receivers

References

External links 

 AT THE TONE: A Little History of NIST Radio Stations WWV & WWVH (1955-2005), © 2009 Myke Dodge Weiskopf / Obscure-Disk.

National Institute of Standards and Technology
Kauai County, Hawaii
Time in the United States
Shortwave radio stations in the United States
Time signal radio stations

de:WWV (Zeitzeichensender)#Kurzwellensender WWVH auf Hawaii